Walter F. March (26 August 1898 – 23 August 1969) was a German architect. Son of German architect Otto March and brother of architect Werner March.

In 1936 he won a gold medal together with his brother Werner in the art competitions of the Olympic Games for their "Reichssportfeld" ("Reich Sport Field").  Father Otto March designed Germany's 1916 Olympic stadium.

Studied with Frank Lloyd Wright in 1925. Became an American citizen. Married Louise Goepfert 1934.  Designed Olympic Village in 1936. Came to America in 1937. He worked  on numerous building in the greater New York area., including the Chrysler Building in New York City.

Architect, artist of many different mediums: hand built ceramic pieces, carved wooden sculptures, and crosses, mosaic crosses and table pieces, one-of-a-kind commissions for churches, metal-work combined with mosaics, and so forth. -Unusual, whimsical, finely designed pieces.

References

External links
 Profile

1898 births
1969 deaths
20th-century German architects
Olympic gold medalists in art competitions
Medalists at the 1936 Summer Olympics
Olympic competitors in art competitions
German emigrants to the United States